The  is a national expressway in Japan. It is managed by East Nippon Expressway Company and Central Nippon Expressway Company.

Overview

The expressway is planned to commence in the city of Shizuoka and terminate in Saku, Nagano The route  the mountainous Chūbu region, connecting Shizuoka, Yamanashi, and Nagano prefectures. Together with the Jōshin-etsu Expressway, the route forms a link connecting the coastline of the Japan Sea with that of the Pacific Ocean.

As of March 2008, most of the route is either under construction or still in the planning stages. Most of the incomplete areas will be built according to the New Direct Control System, whereby the financial burden for construction will be shared by both national and local governments and will be operated as toll-free roads upon completion.

List of interchanges and features

 IC - interchange, JCT - junction, PA - parking area, BS - bus stop, TB - toll plaza

References

External links 

 East Nippon Expressway Company
Central Nippon Expressway Company 

Expressways in Japan
Proposed roads in Japan